The Triesting is a river of Lower Austria, in the southeastern part of the Vienna Woods.

It discharges into the smaller Schwechat at Achau and is part of the catchment area of the River Danube.

Floods 
 1846
 July 1882
 May 1940
 July 1944
 July 1966
 July 1991 (flood wave only in the upper reaches)
 August 1997
 June 2002

The floods of 1944 were the worst ever in the Triesting valley. On 4 July 1944, there were severe floods, following heavy cloudbursts over the upper Triesting valley, in the vicinity of the Schöpfl mountain and in the Further valley. The narrow neck of the valley above Pottenstein was blocked by driftwood and the Fahrafeld Basin turned into a dammed lake. The dam broke and floodwaters up to 2 metres high surged through the valley. In the whole valley 188 people lost their lives, "the majority being foreign workers".

References

Sources 
 Rieck, Walter (1957). Kulturgeographie des Triestingtales. Vienna, Univ., Diss.

External links 

 Water levels at Fahrafeld
 Water levels at Hirtenberg

Remarks

Rivers of Lower Austria
Rivers of Austria